Salisbury, New Brunswick is a town located in Westmorland County, New Brunswick, Canada.

Previously a village, on 1 January 2023 Salisbury annexed parts of four local service districts and became a town.

History

Salisbury first became a permanent settlement when settlers from Yorkshire, England, settled there in 1774 (History, Village of Salisbury Website).

Geography
Salisbury is situated on the north bank of the Petitcodiac River, approximately 25 km west of Moncton and Riverview. Salisbury is called the "Home of the Silver Fox", in reference to its role in adopting Silver Fox farming during the early 20th century (as was Alberton in Prince Edward Island).

Services
The town features elementary, middle, and high schools, an outdoor swimming pool, as well as several family-owned shops and churches servicing the surrounding area. There is also a Royal Canadian Air Cadet Squadron, 580 A/M Hugh Campbell Squadron.

Salisbury is a local service centre for several farming communities which are being transformed into commuter communities in the Petitcodiac River valley. The town is served by Ambulance New Brunswick, Salisbury Fire & Rescue.

Demographics

Population trend

Income (2015)

Mother tongue (2016)

Education
JMA Armstrong High School (9-12)
Salisbury Middle School (5-8)
Salisbury Elementary School (K-4)

Notable people

 Hugh Campbell, former Canadian air marshal.
 Austin Claude Taylor, farmer, merchant and political figure.
 Claude Taylor, former Air Canada President
 Stacy Wilson, former women's hockey player.

Bordering communities

Boundary Creek, New Brunswick
Gallagher Ridge, New Brunswick
Price, New Brunswick
Lewis Mountain, New Brunswick
Moncton, New Brunswick
Second North River, New Brunswick
Kay Settlement
Upper Coverdale
River Glade, New Brunswick
Middlesex, New Brunswick

See also
Greater Moncton
List of communities in New Brunswick

References

External links 

 Salisbury Official Website

Communities in Westmorland County, New Brunswick
Towns in New Brunswick
Communities in Greater Moncton